Bradlee is both a surname and a given name. Notable people with the name include:

Surname
Ben Bradlee (1921–2014), American newspaper editor and writer
Ben Bradlee Jr. (born 1948), American journalist and writer
Frederick Bradlee (1892–1970), American football player
Quinn Bradlee (born 1982), American filmmaker, writer, and activist
Scott Bradlee (born 1981), American musician

Given name
Bradlee Anae (born 1998), American football player
Bradlee Ashby (born 1995), New Zealand swimmer
Bradlee Baladez (born 1991), American soccer player
Bradlee Farrin (born 1964), American politician
Bradlee Heckmann, American biologist and neuroimmunologist
Bradlee Van Pelt (born 1980), American former football player

See also
Bradlees, a defunct American department store chain
Bradley
Bradly